Daithí Gerard McKay (born 1982, Ballymena, County Antrim, Northern Ireland) is a former Irish politician. He was the Chair of the Finance Committee in the Northern Irish Assembly from 2012 to 2016 and a Sinn Féin MLA for North Antrim for 9 years. He brought forward legislation that led to the introduction of a Carrier Bag Levy in Northern Ireland and the abolishment of rates for hundreds of Community Amateur Sport Clubs (CASCs).

In 2016 he began working as a political columnist and commentator. He works in advocacy and is the current Chairperson of the Climate Coalition NI.  

He has a weekly column in the Belfast Telegraph.

Background

McKay was born in Ballymena in 1982 and raised in Rasharkin, County Antrim.

Prior to being elected he was involved in aid work in the Palestinian West Bank where he worked with the International Solidarity Movement accompanying Palestinians to help minimise harassment and attacks from the IDF and Israeli settlers. Whilst there he and his group were present at the scene of the killing of two Palestinians by the Israeli Defence Forces in Tulkarm.

Elected office
He was elected to Ballymoney Council in 2005 becoming the first nationalist councillor from Rasharkin ever to be elected and the youngest ever member of Ballymoney Borough Council.

In 2007, McKay contested the North Antrim seat in the Northern Ireland legislature. He went on to claim his seat after the first count, coming second behind Ian Paisley of the Democratic Unionist Party (DUP). McKay received 7,065 votes to Paisley's 7,716. Paisley's son, Ian Paisley Jr. came in third.

This is the closest anyone ever came to beating Ian Paisley in an election.

McKay was the youngest Member elected to the 2007 Assembly and he became one of the first Sinn Féin members to sit on the Policing Board along with Martina Anderson and Alex Maskey.

In September 2007 McKay sparked off a political scandal in the Assembly when he used parliamentary privilege to name private developer Seymour Sweeney as a member of the DUP. The DUP Environment Minister, Arlene Foster, had said that she was 'minded' to approve an application from Sweeney for a private visitor centre at the Giant's Causeway, even though her Planning Service officials had recommended that it be refused.

Foster threatened to take McKay to court over the matter but in January 2008 she decided to refuse the private application.

Attacks and threats

In June 2003 McKay was one of a group of Sinn Féin members, including Martin McGuinness and Philip McGuigan, attacked by a loyalist mob in Ballymoney. McGuinness said that "some of them tried to break the windows of the car with their fists, and it was quite a dangerous situation. I think if they had gained access into the car, it could have been quite a nasty situation."

In June 2008, he was one of four Sinn Féin councillors in north Antrim who reportedly received death threats.

In July 2008, McKay and fellow Sinn Féin member Cllr Padraig McShane sustained minor injuries in a dispute with local youths in Ballymena. The dispute arose because of the youths' opposition to the removal of a bonfire to commemorate internment (Operation Demetrius). McKay said they were in the area "in opposition to criminal and antisocial elements who are using this bonfire as a cover for other activities". The incident was captured by a BBC camera crew.

In May 2009 there were a series of attacks on property in Rasharkin, including an attack on McKay's house and a cafe in the village. The North Antrim MLA blamed anti-social elements and said that these people would not deter him from his work.

A bomb threat was phoned through to McKay's Sinn Féin office in 2015. The caller claimed that a bomb had been left outside McKay's home but police later declared this a hoax after searches took place at his property.

Rasharkin parades

McKay was involved in protests against the Ballymaconnelly parade through the mainly nationalist village of Rasharkin since they began in 2004.

In 2010 the parade was restricted and for the first time was only allowed to march the Main Street on the outward parade but not return.

In 2012 two men were fined by a court after McKay reported them for posting sectarian messages on Facebook relating to the village. One of the accused was alleged to have posted:
"Let's show the scum in Rasharkin (a Co Antrim village where many Catholics live) how it is done."
"God save the Queen. For God and Ulster, Kill all taigs. Lest we forget."

In 2012 representation from McKay and others in the Rasharkin Residents Association helped secure a determination from the Parades Commission that the parade be reduced from 44 to 25 bands.

He highlighted UVF and UDA paramilitary displays at the parade and, in 2015, the Parades Commission introduced a flags ban on the parade.

Carrier Bag Levy
In 2011 McKay introduced the "Single Use Plastic Bag Bill" which was passed by the Assembly as the "Single Use Carrier Bag Act 2011". He had raised the matter through a Private Members Debate previously and is believed to be responsible for Sinn Féin ensuring that the levy was included in the Executive's Budget in 2010. The Act amended part of the Climate Change Act 2008.

The 5 pence levy was introduced in 2013 and his bill also ensured that the proceeds went towards environmental and community projects.

It has resulted in the reduction in usage of carrier bags in Northern Ireland by tens of millions annually.

He remains only one of two Sinn Féin MLAs to have successfully passed a Private Members Bill in the Assembly since 1998.

The SpAd Bill
In 2013 McKay led the opposition to the Special Advisers Bill brought forward by TUV leader Jim Allister.  The Bill aimed to dis-bar ex-prisoners from being Special Advisors to Ministers in the Executive. During the closing debate in which Allister's Bill was ultimately passed McKay made a "marathon 2-hour speech" in opposition. This remains the longest speech ever made by an MLA in the Assembly.

Campaign to abolish rates for Sport Clubs
In 2013 Daithí McKay started a campaign to abolish rates for sport clubs. In his second piece of legislation he proposed that CASCs (Community Amateur Sport Clubs) should have 100% rate relief on their grounds and facilities. In the Bill consultation he received over 1,000 responses, one of the most successful consultations for an Assembly Bill to date. He secured the support of the majority of MLAs but the DUP blocked the bill controversially using the Petition of Concern.

The campaign still proved successful with the Department of Finance subsequently committing to grant 100% rate relief for clubs as long as they did not have licensed bars. A proposal put by McKay to the Assembly was also passed that ensured that the Department had to have regulations in place by the end of September 2016.

On 26 October 2016 full relief for CASCs without bars was introduced by the Finance Minister.

Campaign for equal marriage

McKay was a strong supporter of LGBT rights in the Assembly. He spoke in debates to extend marriage to same sex couples between 2012 and 2016 and jointly tabled a number of the motions put to the Assembly.

In April 2014 speaking to a motion that he tabled along with 5 other members he said that

"Homophobia is fuelling the political representation in much of the debate here today.  This is about gay people being treated as less than everyone else.  Gay men and women are deserving of the same rights that I have and of the same rights that you have."

"Two people who love each other and who have their love recognised through marriage pose no threat to anybody."

He was one of 3 Sinn Féin MLAs to table a motion calling for equal marriage to be introduced in April 2015 and it was defeated by 49 votes to 47.

In November 2015 he again was one of 6 MLAs that tabled a motion calling on the Executive "to table legislation to allow for same sex marriage." 53 MLAs supported the motion and 52 opposed. It was the first time that a majority of Assembly members had expressed support for marriage to be extended to same sex couples.

He has remained a vocal supporter of LGBTI rights since he left the Assembly.

Resignation
 
On 13 July 2016 McKay called on the Parades Commission to bar Dervock Young Defenders band from partaking in parades in sensitive areas following an incident in Ballycastle.

After McKay made a presentation to the commission with members of the Rasharkin Residents Association the band were barred from participating in the Ballymaconnelly parade.

It was alleged that after this parade decision was made the loyalist blogger Jamie Bryson leaked details of messages he exchanged with McKay in which McKay allegedly refers Bryson to a third party whilst he chaired the NAMA Enquiry in the Assembly.

The First Minister Peter Robinson resigned less than 2 months after Bryson made allegations at the Finance Committee and McKay was accused of helping to 'take out' the First Minister that was in office with his party colleague Martin McGuinness at the time.

McKay resigned as an MLA on 18 August 2016.

Columnist and writer

McKay began writing for the Belfast Telegraph and the political blog Slugger O'Toole in December 2016. He also began working as a commentator on BBC and ITV.

In his first article he called on mainly nationalist councils to introduce the flying of the tricolour from government buildings in the north for the first time by adopting a flags policy of equality rather than neutrality.

McKay believes that the mandatory coalition system that puts parties in power automatically is flawed. He has called for Assembly reform. A suggestion he has put forward for discussion is that a hybrid model of a weighted majority system retaining some cross-community safeguards would help address political 'gridlock'.

After the Assembly collapsed over the Renewable Heat Incentive scandal in early 2017 McKay said that the Irish Language Act, unimplemented since the St Andrew's Agreement, should be agreed before the institutions are restored.

In July 2017 he described the Eleventh night as similar to the film The Purge, where all laws are suspended for one night a year and people allowed to do whatever they want, with no consequences.

In August 2017 he criticised the DUP MLA Jim Wells after the South Down man resigned from the National Trust due to their participation in Belfast Pride parade.

In 2022 he said that the Secretary of State had a responsibility to outline publicly how an Irish unity referendum "might be triggered" given rising levels of support for a border poll. 

He currently has a weekly column in the Belfast Telegraph.

Committees
Health 2015–2016
Finance 2010–2011 and 2012–2016 (Chairperson from 2012 to 2016)
Education 2011–2012
Enterprise, Trade & Investment (Deputy Chairperson from 2010 to 2012)
Environment 2007–2010
Public Accounts Committee 2012–2015
Rasharkin Community Association
Rasharkin Residents Association
Chair and Founder of the Assembly All-Party Working Group on Climate Change 2008–2011
Member of All Party group on Cycling 2014–2016

References

Living people
1982 births
Sinn Féin MLAs
Northern Ireland MLAs 2007–2011
Northern Ireland MLAs 2011–2016
People from Ballymena
Northern Ireland MLAs 2016–2017
Sinn Féin councillors in Northern Ireland
Members of Ballymoney Borough Council
Sinn Féin parliamentary candidates